In telecommunication, the term communications deception has the following meanings:

 Deliberate transmission, retransmission, or alteration of communications to mislead an adversary's interpretation of the communications.
 Use of devices, operations, and techniques with the intent of confusing or misleading the user of a communications link or a navigation system.

References

National Information Systems Security Glossary

Military communications
Deception
Phreaking
Telephone crimes